Marie Molijn (1837-1932) was a Dutch artist known for still lifes.

Biography 
Molijn was born on 19 November 1837 in Rotterdam where she lived until she moved to The Hague in 1901. She died on 21 February 1932 in The Hague. Her sister was Ida Molijn, also a painter.

Gallery

References

External links
 

1837 births
1932 deaths
Artists from Rotterdam
19th-century Dutch women artists
20th-century Dutch women artists